Smardzko  (formerly German Simmatzig) is a village in the administrative district of Gmina Świdwin, within Świdwin County, West Pomeranian Voivodeship, in north-western Poland.

See also
History of Pomerania

References

Smardzko